The Norwegian Institute for Urban and Regional Research (NIBR) is a social science research institute based in Oslo, Norway.

It is a part of the Oslo Centre for Interdisciplinary Environmental and Social Research cooperative umbrella organization. Its purpose is to conduct "studies which promote society's ability to tackle environmental and social development challenges". The current director general of NIBR is dr. polit Hilde Lorentzen.

Departments
NIBR has four departments: 
- Dept. for Housing and Environmental Planning Research 
- Dept. for International Studies in Development, Transition and Migration 
- Dept. for Socioeconomic and Territorial Studies 
- Dept. for Welfare, Democracy and Governance Research

External links
 Official website

Research institutes in Norway
Education in Oslo
Independent research institutes
Social science institutes
Urban studies and planning schools